McCreath is a surname. Notable people with the surname include:

Anthony McCreath (born 1970), Jamaican footballer
Nicholas McCreath (born 1978), Jamaican footballer
Peter McCreath (born 1943), Canadian politician
Ralph McCreath, Canadian figure skater

See also
Simone Badal-McCreath, Jamaican chemist and cancer researcher